Nicholas Marcus Fernando (6 December 1932 – 10 April 2020) was a Sri Lankan Roman Catholic archbishop.

Fernando was born in Negombo  Sri Lanka and was ordained to the priesthood in 1959. He served as archbishop of the Roman Catholic Archdiocese of Colombo, Sri Lanka, from 1977 until 2002.

Notes

External links

1932 births
2020 deaths
21st-century Roman Catholic archbishops in Sri Lanka
20th-century Roman Catholic archbishops in Sri Lanka
Roman Catholic archbishops of Colombo